Flood is the second studio album by Welsh-Australian musician Stella Donnelly, released on 26 August 2022 by Secretly Canadian. It peaked at number 29 on the ARIA Albums Chart. Written while travelling around Australia before and during the COVID-19 pandemic, the album was preceded by three singles – "Lungs", title track "Flood" and "How Was Your Day?".

Background 
Following the success of her 2019 debut studio album Beware of the Dogs, Donnelly moved around the country amidst the COVID-19 pandemic and wrote as much as 43 songs during the travel. She became obsessed with birdwatching and became an ambassador for BirdLife Australia in 2021.

Flood is described by Donnelly as the product of "months of risky experimentation, hard months of introspection, and a lot of transition". The songwriting is set to involve discussion of “relationships, be them familial, romantic or platonic”, with the artist explaining her interest in "observing human dynamics".

Release 
On 10 May 2022, Donnelly premiered lead single "Lungs" live on Triple J, and announced the release date for Flood of 26 August 2022. A music video for the song was also released, directed by herself and Duncan Wright. The title track "Flood" was released as the second single on 21 June 2022. Third single "How Was Your Day?" was released on 3 August 2022.

Tour 
Donnelly embarked on the Flood World Tour on 11 September 2022, but performed two legs around Europe prior, supporting Australian band Rolling Blackouts Coastal Fever on their tour. She is scheduled to conclude the tour on 1 April 2023 in Margaret River, Western Australia, having completed 75 shows.

Critical reception 

According to Metacritic, Flood has received "generally favourable reviews". Laura Snapes of Pitchfork praised the album for exploring "how we seek and create safety, which she essays with captivating tenderness". Rhian Daly of NME, in a four-star review, called it a "beautiful, thought-provoking" album, containing "soft, lush pieces that deep-dive into life’s everyday moments and turn them into something extraordinary". Writing for The Guardian, Giselle Au-Nhien Nguyen called Flood "awash with vivid imagery", "deeply personal" and wrote "while Flood is overall darker than the musician’s past work, there’s still a lot of joy to be found".

Track listing 
All tracks written by Stella Donnelly; "Move Me" co-written by Joe Russo. All tracks produced by Donnelly and Anna Laverty, unless otherwise noted.

Personnel 
Musicians
 Stella Donnelly – vocals, piano , synth , guitar , lap steel , xylophone , writing, producer
 Jack Arnett – saxophone 
 Jeniffer Aslett – bass , backing vocals 
 George Foster – piano , guitar , acoustic guitar , backing vocals , drums 
 Jack Gaby – guitar , piano , backing vocals , synth , lap steel , drum machine 
 Broderick Madden-Scott – backing vocals 
 Joe Russo – writing 
 Thom Stewart – backing vocals 
 Marcel Tussie – drums and percussion , backing vocals 
 Julia Wallace – fluegelhorn , backing vocals 
 Jake Webb – guitar 
Technical
 Jack Arnett – studio assistant 
 Anna Laverty – producer 
 Broderick Madden-Scott – engineer 
 Lesse Marhaug – mixing
 Stephan Mathieu – mastering
 Jordan Shakespeare – studio assistant 
 Jake Webb – producer 
Promotional
 Emma Daisy – photography
 Tom Hunt – artwork photography
 Miles Johnson – cover art
 Olivia Senior – photography

Charts

Release history

References



2022 albums
Music in Perth, Western Australia